Contemporary Works II is a limited edition 5-disc CD box set released by Klaus Schulze in 2002 containing new studio material. This set was released two years after Contemporary Works I. One of the discs has been reissued in 2008 as part of the overall reissue program of Schulze back catalog by Revisited Records, another two were released by MIG Music in 2016 and 2017, and another one in 2018. The first 333 copies of this set contained a bonus sixth disc.

Track listing
All tracks composed by Klaus Schulze.

Disc 1: Virtual Outback (reissued in 2008)

Disc 2: Timbres of Ice (reissued in 2019)

Disc 3: Another Green Mile (reissued in 2016)

Disc 4: Androgyn (reissued in 2017)

Disc 5: Cocooning (reissued in 2018)

Disc 6: Thank You (included only with the first 333 copies)

Personnel
 Klaus Schulze – electronics, keyboards, guitar
 Wolfgang Tiepold – cello
 Thomas Kagermann – Arabian flute, violin, vocals
 Julia Messenger – vocals
 Audrey Motaung – vocals
 Tobias Becker – oboe, English horn
 Mickes – guitar
 Tom Dams – some groove loops

See also
Silver Edition
Historic Edition
Jubilee Edition
The Ultimate Edition

References

External links
 Contemporary Works II at the official site of Klaus Schulze
 
 

Klaus Schulze albums
2002 compilation albums